The JGR  is a steam locomotive formerly operated in Japan by  Japanese Government Railways.

Specifications
The diameter of the driving wheel is 1,067 mm (3.5 feet) while the axle arrangement 0-6-0 is a tender type steam locomotive for a two-cylinder single satellite type freight train. 

The tender has two axles. The valve system is an Allan type, the safety valve is a SALTER type, and a steam dome is provided on a boiler.  

It has a rapid injection (pop type) safety valve. In keeping with the style of the time, the locomotive body was not equipped with a brake device; a brake was provided only for the tender.  

This form was used with relatively little remodeling compared to the 2-4-0 type tank locomotive imported at the same time. Additionally, it was used for installing the brake device to the locomotive body and installing a salter type safety valve. In some cases, the cylinder cover was also enlarged.

See also
 Japan Railways locomotive numbering and classification

References

0-6-0 locomotives
1067 mm gauge locomotives of Japan
Scrapped locomotives
Steam locomotives of Japan
Shunting locomotives